Chaetobromus is a genus of African plants in the grass family.

 Species
There is only one known species, Chaetobromus involucratus, native to Namibia and Cape Province.

 Subspecies
Three subspecies are accepted
 Chaetobromus involucratus subsp. dregeanus (Nees) Verboom
 Chaetobromus involucratus subsp. involucratus
 Chaetobromus involucratus subsp. sericeus (Nees) Verboom

 Formerly included
taxa once considered part of Chaetobromus but now regarded as better suited to Tenaxia : 
 Chaetobromus fascicularis - Tenaxia stricta
 Chaetobromus strictus - Tenaxia stricta

See also
 List of Poaceae genera

References

Danthonioideae
Grasses of Africa
Grasses of South Africa
Flora of Namibia
Flora of Southern Africa
Monotypic Poaceae genera
Taxa named by Christian Gottfried Daniel Nees von Esenbeck